The 1984 Winter Paralympic Games were the third Winter Paralympics. They were held from 14 to 20 January 1984 in Innsbruck, Austria. They were the first Winter Games organized by the International Co-ordinating Committee (ICC), which was formed on 15 March 1982, in Leysin, Switzerland. These Games were accessible for all athletes with cerebral palsy.  Three sports were contested: alpine skiing, cross-country skiing, and ice sledge speed racing. The most successful athlete was German alpine skier Reinhild Moeller, who won 3 gold medals and 1 silver medal. The Games, then known as the 3rd World Winter Games for the Disabled, were fully sanctioned by the International Olympic Committee (IOC).  (The regular 1984 Winter Olympics were held in Sarajevo, Yugoslavia. For the first time, an exhibition event was held at the Olympic Winter Games there and 30 male three-track skiers took part in the Giant Slalom event in Sarajevo.)

Sports
 Alpine skiing
 Ice sledge speed racing
 Cross-country skiing

Medal table

The top 10 NPCs by number of gold medals are listed below. The host nation (Austria) is highlighted.

Participating nations
Twenty one nations participated in the 1984 Winter Paralympics. Netherlands and Spain made their debut appearances. Belgium and Poland returned to the Winter Games after missing out in the 1980 Winter Paralympics.

 (Host nation)

See also

 1984 Winter Olympics
 1984 Summer Paralympics

References

External links
International Paralympic Committee
The event at SVT's open archive 

 
Paralympics Winter
P
Winter Paralympics, 1984
Winter Paralympic Games
Sports competitions in Innsbruck
Winter multi-sport events in Austria
January 1984 sports events in Europe
1980s in Innsbruck